The North American Figure Skating Championships were a former elite figure skating competition for skaters from the United States and Canada. It was a biennial (every two years) competition held between 1923 and 1971, with locations alternating between the two countries.

History 
Although the event was classified as an "international competition" under International Skating Union rules, it was actually a cooperative venture between the United States Figure Skating Association and the Canadian Figure Skating Association, which both had their roots in a former organization called the Ice Skating Union of America. The latter organization had sponsored competitions open to skaters of both countries as early as 1913.

The 1943 competition was canceled due to World War II and the 1945 competition included ladies single skating only. Ice dance was included for the first time in 1947.

The competition was discontinued when the Canadian federation abruptly canceled its participation in the 1973 event, which was to have been held in Rochester, New York. The CFSA cited problems with the judging (which tended to favor the skaters of whichever country had a majority of judges on the panel) and the reluctance of top skaters from both countries to participate in an event immediately before the World Figure Skating Championships. In fact, the CFSA was at that time already planning to hold its own international competition, the first Skate Canada International, in the fall of 1973. This event would be open to skaters from all ISU member countries and use international judges. The USFSA established its own international competition, Skate America, in the fall of 1979.

Medalists

Men

Ladies

Pairs

Ice dance

Fours
Fours competitions were held only in the indicated years.

References

1971 disestablishments
Figure skating competitions
 
Recurring sporting events established in 1923